The Standard Assessment Procedure (SAP) is the UK government's recommended method system for measuring the energy rating of residential dwellings. The methodology is owned by the Department for Business, Energy & Industrial Strategy, and produced under licence by BRE. The first version was published in 1995, and was replaced by newer versions in 1998, 2001, 2005, 2009,  2012, and 2021.  It calculates the typical annual energy costs for space and water heating, and, from 2005, lighting.  The CO2 emissions are also calculated. The SAP runs from 1 to 100+, with dwellings that have SAP>100 being net exporters of energy.

SAP 2012 has been used as the basis for checking new dwellings for compliance with building regulations in the United Kingdom requiring the conservation of fuel and power since 6 April 2014 in England or 31 July 2014 in Wales.

A reduced data version of SAP, RDSAP, is used for existing dwellings. SAP or RDSAP was used to produce the energy report and Energy Performance Certificate in Home Information Packs (HIPs). A document was published by the UK government in 2007, looking towards SAP and energy standards in the future.

A number of comparisons have indicated that SAP does not provide an accurate model for low-energy buildings.

The Standard Assessment Procedure evolved from the National Home Energy Rating scheme, which was based upon the Milton Keynes Energy Cost Index created for the Energy World demonstration buildings in the 1980s.

References

External links 
  Department for Communities . . .   Building Regulations: Energy efficiency requirements for new dwellings - A forward look at what standards may be in 2010 and 2013 .
  UK Building Regulations - Full text of the regulations in .pdf format - UK Government Planning Portal site

Housing in the United Kingdom
Building engineering
Construction industry of the United Kingdom